This is a list of anime broadcast by TV Asahi and its affiliates.

TV series (current)

TV series (all)

1960s

1970s

1980s

1990s

2020s

References

TV Asahi
TV Asahi
TV Asahi